David Deutsch (c. 1929 – June 13, 2013) was an American advertising executive and artist. He founded David Deutsch Associates, now known as Deutsch Inc., in 1969. He served as the agency's CEO from 1969 until 1989, when he handed control of the company to his son, Donny Deutsch.

Biography
Deutsch was a veteran within the advertising industry before founding his own agency. He worked for McCann Erickson for 13 years. He then moved to Ogilvy & Mather, where he held the position of creative director for four years.

In 1969, Deutsch established his own agency, David Deutsch Associates, based in New York City. Oneida Limited, a tableware and cutlery designer, was his first flagship client. Under Deutsch, his boutique agency, which initially focused on creative-services, evolved into a full-service agency known for high quality print advertising. By 1983, Deutsch's client list included well known brands of the time, including Pontiac. Many of the agency's clients included so-called "prestige brands," including Letts of London and Crouch Fitzgerald. In a 1970 interview with Advertising Age, Deutsch spoke of the importance he placed on hard work: "After I show [a prospective client] my work, I can say, truthfully, that I'm talking to him as the man who will do the work...I tell him I'm dependent on him and that I'm more apt to do more for him because of it. And then I go out and work long hours to make sure I keep my promises." His son, Donny Deutsch, joined the company in 1983.

In 1989, Deutsch turned control of his agency over to his son, Donny. Donny Deutsch renamed the agency Deutsch Inc., its present name. The same year he took over his father's company, Donny Deutsch launched an unprecedented ad campaign for IKEA, featuring gay and interracial couples. His successful campaign, that included Dining Room, the first TV commercial in the country that showed a gay couple, made IKEA a widely known, relevant company to North American consumers. Donny Deutsch, who opened new offices in Boston, Chicago and Los Angeles, increased the agency's billing from $70 million in 1989 to $800 million in 1998. Deutsch Inc. was sold to Interpublic Group in 2000.

David Deutsch remained in advertising for four years after giving up day-to-day control over David Deutsch Associates. He retired from the ad industry in 1993. Deutsch then pursued his interest in fine arts. He opened numerous solo art exhibitions and shows in Florida and New York. His artwork earned awards from juries at shows held in several museums, including the Cornell Fine Arts Museum and the Boca Raton Museum of Art, as well art galleries such as the Ora Sorensen Gallery, Noho Gallery, Wally Findlay Galleries International Inc., Carlynn Gallery, and the Verdian Gallery.

Personal life
David Deutsch died of natural causes on June 13, 2013, at the age of 84. He was survived by his wife, Francine, and two children, Donny Deutsch and Amy Deutsch. His funeral was held at Riverside Memorial Chapel in Manhattan.

References

1929 births
2013 deaths
20th-century American businesspeople
American advertising executives
American artists
American chairpersons of corporations
American chief executives
American corporate directors
Businesspeople from New York City